KNVO (channel 48) is a television station licensed to McAllen, Texas, United States, serving the Lower Rio Grande Valley as an affiliate of the Spanish-language Univision network. It is owned by Entravision Communications alongside Harlingen-licensed Fox affiliate KFXV, channel 60 (and translators KMBH-LD and KXFX-CD), primary CW+ affiliate and secondary PBS member KCWT-CD (channel 21), and Class A UniMás affiliate KTFV-CD (channel 32). The stations share studios on North Jackson Road in McAllen, while KNVO's transmitter is located on Farm to Market Road 493 near Donna, Texas.

History
The Federal Communications Commission (FCC) granted an original construction permit on October 9, 1983, to build a television station licensed in McAllen. Originally, the station was approved to broadcast on UHF channel 48 with 4,071 kW effective radiated power, but was later changed to 3,162 kW on April 16, 1992. The station made its debut on October 12, 1992. During the station's first years on the air, KNVO quickly became the highest-rated station in the market.

In 1996, LS Broadcasting, Ltd., Mundo Vision Broadcasting Company and Larry Safir (the owners of the station) station sold the licensee of KNVO to Entravision Communications for $24,8 million. Sale was completed on January 24, 1997.

On October 11, 2001, the Federal Communications Commission granted a permit to construct the station's digital facilities (requested in 1999). The station completed construction of its full-power digital facilities in June 2006, and was granted a license on June 26, 2007.

News operation

KNVO's newscast debuted in 1999. The station presently broadcasts seven hours of locally produced newscasts each week (with one hour each on weekdays, Saturdays and Sundays). In September 2010, KNVO started broadcasting local news in high definition.

As of 2012, KNVO was the second highest-rated newscast in the market, behind ABC affiliate KRGV-TV (channel 5).

In early December 2015, Entravision canceled the morning newscasts at all of its stations in the United States, including KNVO's Alegre Despertar.

Technical information

Subchannels
The station's digital signal is multiplexed:

Analog-to-digital conversion
KNVO shut down its analog signal, over UHF channel 48, on June 12, 2009, the official date in which full-power television stations in the United States transitioned from analog to digital broadcasts under federal mandate. The station's digital signal remained on its pre-transition UHF channel 49. Through the use of PSIP, digital television receivers display the station's virtual channel as its former UHF analog channel 48.

References

External links

Television channels and stations established in 1992
1992 establishments in Texas
Univision network affiliates
UniMás network affiliates
LATV affiliates
Ion Television affiliates
Television stations in the Lower Rio Grande Valley
Spanish-language television stations in Texas
Entravision Communications stations